Velázquez is a small town in the Rocha Department of southeastern Uruguay.

Geography
The stream Arroyo India Muerta flows east of the town.

History
On 28 October 1919, it was declared a "Pueblo" (village) by the Act of Ley N° 7.019. Its status was elevated to "Villa" (town) on 1 July 1953 by the Act of Ley N° 11.965.

Population
In 2011 Velázquez had a population of 1,022.
 
Source: Instituto Nacional de Estadística de Uruguay

References

External links
INE map of Velázquez

Populated places in the Rocha Department